Wissam Eid was a senior intelligence official within the Internal Security Forces of Lebanon. He was in charge of the technical aspect of the investigations into the attacks that occurred since 2004, and had provided important information to the international investigation into the assassination of the former prime minister Rafic Hariri.

Biography
Eid was born 2 October 1976 in Deir Ammar, near Tripoli. Son of an officer of the Lebanese ISF, he studied in Tripoli, then he obtained an engineering diploma in computer information systems from the University of Balamand in 1999.

On 25 January 2008 at 10 a.m., despite his armoured vehicle, a car bomb attack containing an explosive charge of at least 50 kg of explosives killed him, along with his bodyguard and two civilians, and injured dozens of people. The attack occurred in the suburb of Hazmiyeh.

See also 
 Rafic Hariri
 List of attacks in Lebanon

References

External links 
 Captain Wissam Eid Was The Genius Who Crunched The Data
 Hariri Tribunal Finds Hezbollah Operatives Guilty, Excuses Lebanese Terrorist Organization Itself. Foreign Policy Magazine; Oz Katerji, August 19, 2020.
 Everything You Need To Know About The Exposed Cell Networks Behind Hariri’s Assassination

1976 births
2008 deaths
University of Balamand alumni
People from North Governorate
Deaths by car bomb in Lebanon
People murdered in Lebanon
Terrorism deaths in Lebanon
Lebanese terrorism victims